Syncesia madagascariensis is a rare species of crustose lichen in the family Roccellaceae. Found in Madagascar, it was formally described as a new species in 2010 by Damien Ertz, Dorothee Killmann, Tahina Razafindrahaja, Emmanuël Sérusiaux, and Eberhard Fischer. It is only known to occur at the type locality, where it grows on tree trunks in a montane forest of mostly Myrtaceae and Syzygium.

The photobiont partner is green algae from genus Trentepohlia; their cells are 7–14 by 6–10 μm. The ascospores have 5 septa, which distinguishes this species from others in genus Syncesia, whose spores typically have 3 septa. Syncesia madagascariensis contains protocetraric acid as a major metabolite, and trace amounts of what is probably roccellic acid.

References

Roccellaceae
Lichen species
Lichens described in 2010
Lichens of Madagascar
Taxa named by Emmanuël Sérusiaux